In mathematics, the probabilistic method is a nonconstructive method, primarily used in combinatorics and pioneered by Paul Erdős, for proving the existence of a prescribed kind of mathematical object. It works by showing that if one randomly chooses objects from a specified class, the probability that the result is of the prescribed kind is strictly greater than zero. Although the proof uses probability, the final conclusion is determined for certain, without any possible error.

This method has now been applied to other areas of mathematics such as number theory, linear algebra, and real analysis, as well as in computer science (e.g. randomized rounding), and information theory.

Introduction
If every object in a collection of objects fails to have a certain property, then the probability that a random object chosen from the collection has that property is zero.

Similarly, showing that the probability is (strictly) less than 1 can be used to prove the existence of an object that does not satisfy the prescribed properties.

Another way to use the probabilistic method is by calculating the expected value of some random variable. If it can be shown that the random variable can take on a value less than the expected value, this proves that the random variable can also take on some value greater than the expected value. 

Alternatively, the probabilistic method can also be used to guarantee the existence of a desired element in a sample space with a value that is greater than or equal to the calculated expected value, since the non-existence of such element would imply every element in the sample space is less than the expected value, a contradiction.

Common tools used in the probabilistic method include Markov's inequality, the Chernoff bound, and the Lovász local lemma.

Two examples due to Erdős
Although others before him proved theorems via the probabilistic method (for example, Szele's 1943 result that there exist tournaments containing a large number of Hamiltonian cycles), many of the most well known proofs using this method are due to Erdős. The first example below describes one such result from 1947 that gives a proof of a lower bound for the Ramsey number .

First example
Suppose we have a complete graph on  vertices. We wish to show (for small enough values of ) that it is possible to color the edges of the graph in two colors (say red and blue) so that there is no complete subgraph on  vertices which is monochromatic (every edge colored the same color).

To do so, we color the graph randomly. We calculate the expected number of monochromatic subgraphs on  vertices as follows:

For any set  of  vertices from our graph, define the variable  to be  if every edge amongst the  vertices is the same color, and  otherwise.

(the factor of  comes because there are two possible colors).

The sum of expectations is the expectation of the sum (regardless of whether the variables are independent), so the expectation of the sum (the expected number of all monochromatic -subgraphs) is

The number of monochromatic -subgraphs in this random coloring is a non-negative integer, hence it must be  ( is the only non-negative integer less than ). It follows that if

A weakness of this argument is that it is entirely nonconstructive. Even though it proves (for example) that almost every coloring of the complete graph on  vertices contains no monochromatic -subgraph, it gives no explicit example of such a coloring. The problem of finding such a coloring has been open for more than 50 years.

Second example

Let  be very large and consider a random graph  on  vertices, where every edge in  exists with probability . We show that with positive probability,  satisfies the following two properties:

Proof. The number of cycles of length  in the complete graph on  vertices is

Hence by Markov's inequality we have

Property 2.  contains no independent set of size .

Proof. Clearly, we have

when

For sufficiently large , the probability that a graph from the distribution has both properties is positive, as the events for these properties cannot be disjoint (if they were, their probabilities would sum up to more than 1).

We can see that this new graph has no independent set of size .  can only be partitioned into at least  independent sets, and, hence, has chromatic number at least .

This result gives a hint as to why the computation of the chromatic number of a graph is so difficult: even when there are no local reasons (such as small cycles) for a graph to require many colors the chromatic number can still be arbitrarily large.

See also

Interactive proof system
Las Vegas algorithm
Method of conditional probabilities
Probabilistic proofs of non-probabilistic theorems
Random graph

Additional resources 

 Probabilistic Methods in Combinatorics, MIT OpenCourseWare

References
 Alon, Noga; Spencer, Joel H. (2000).  The probabilistic method (2ed).  New York: Wiley-Interscience.  .
 
 
 J. Matoušek, J. Vondrak. The Probabilistic Method. Lecture notes.
 Alon, N and Krivelevich, M (2006). Extremal and Probabilistic Combinatorics
 Elishakoff I., Probabilistic Methods in the Theory of Structures: Random Strength of Materials, Random Vibration, and Buckling, World Scientific, Singapore, 2017

Footnotes

Combinatorics
Mathematical proofs
Probabilistic arguments